Lotte Meitner-Graf (1899–1973) was a noted Austrian black-and-white portrait photographer.

Meitner-Graf moved to England with her family in 1937, opening her own studio at 23 Old Bond Street in London in 1953. Frisch, in his Times obituary, noted that there "can be few educated people who have not seen one of Lotte Meitner-Graf’s photographic portraits, either on a book jacket (for instance, Bertrand Russell’s autobiography, or Antony Hopkins’s Music All Around Me) or on a record sleeve or concert programme."

She photographed Albert Schweitzer, musicians Marion Anderson, Otto Klemperer and Yehudi Menuhin; actors John Gielgud and Danny Kaye; and scientists Lord Blackett, William Lawrence Bragg, Dorothy Hodgkin, and Max Perutz.

References

Portrait photographers
1899 births
1973 deaths
Austrian photographers
Austrian women photographers